Rancho Los Méganos was a  Mexican land grant in the southwestern Sacramento-San Joaquin Delta region of present-day Contra Costa County, California.

It was given in 1835 by Governor José Castro to José Noriega.  "Méganos" means "sand dunes" in Spanish.

Rancho Los Méganos extends eastward from present-day Antioch along the San Joaquin River to the Old River. The rancho lands included present-day Oakley, Knightsen, and Brentwood.

History

José Noreiga arrived in California in 1834 and received the between three and four square leagues Los Méganos grant in 1835. John Marsh bought the rancho from Jose Noriega in 1837.  From that time Los Méganos was also known as the Marsh Ranch.  In 1851, Marsh married Abbie Tuck, and in 1854 started on a new house (the stone house).  But Abbie Marsh died in 1855, before the house was finished, leaving Marsh and their young daughter Alice.  John Marsh was murdered in 1856 by disgruntled employees who felt that he had cheated them out of their wages.
 
With the cession of California to the United States following the Mexican-American War, the 1848 Treaty of Guadalupe Hidalgo provided that the land grants would be honored.  As required by the Land Act of 1851, a claim for Rancho Los Méganos was filed with the Public Land Commission by John Marsh in 1852, and the grant was patented to daughter Alice Marsh in 1867.

Alice Marsh married William Walker Camron in 1871. The couple later lived in Oakland in the Camron-Stanford House, originally erected by Dr. Samuel Merritt on the southwest shore of Lake Merritt. In 1871 son, Charles P. Marsh, mortgaged the rancho and lost it to the Savings and Loan Society (of San Francisco), who sold the property to James T. Sanford of New York.  In 1878, the Savings and Loan Society foreclosed on Sanford and held the rancho until 1900, when the Balfour Guthrie Investment company purchased the rancho.

Historic sites of the Rancho

Stone House of John Marsh.  Completed in 1856.
Site of the Murder of Dr John Marsh.

See also

Marsh Creek State Park (California)

References

External links 
 John Marsh Trust
 San Francisco Chronicle article on John Marsh
 John Marsh House
  Mero, William. "Love, Life and Death on the California Frontier: A Woman's Life in Old Contra Costa.

Méganos, Los
Los Méganos
Antioch, California
Brentwood, California
Los Méganos